Kim Young-uk (born April 29, 1991) is a South Korean football player who plays for Jeju United.

External links
 
Kim Young-uk at dragons.co.kr
Kim Young-uk at Asian Games Incheon 2014

1991 births
Living people
Association football midfielders
South Korean footballers
Jeonnam Dragons players
K League 1 players
K League 2 players
Footballers at the 2014 Asian Games
Asian Games medalists in football
Yonsei University alumni
Asian Games gold medalists for South Korea
Medalists at the 2014 Asian Games